The Dayton Biltmore Hotel is a historic hotel built in 1929 and located at the junction of First and Main Streets in downtown Dayton, Ohio, United States.  From construction in 1929 through much of the rest of the twentieth century, the Biltmore was a prominent hotel, while later renovations have converted it into apartments with space for smaller businesses.  It was named a federal historic site in 1982.

History
Opened on November 16, 1929, the Dayton Biltmore Hotel was designed in the Beaux-Arts style popular at the time. It features an applied masonry façade system, exhibiting both brick and terra cotta, resulting in a dark brown and white exterior. The architect, Frederick Hughes (of the architecture firm F.J. Hughes and Company), is also known for the nearby Commodore Apartments and the Centre City Building, which were designed in a similar style. One of the tallest buildings in Dayton, the Biltmore was considered one of the finest hotels in America, playing host to some of the nation's most powerful and celebrated men in the 20th century, such as John F. Kennedy and Elvis Presley.

The Dayton Biltmore was originally operated by Bowman-Biltmore Hotels. It was purchased by Hilton Hotels in 1946. The Dayton Biltmore became a Sheraton in March 1965 and was renamed the Sheraton-Dayton Hotel. It left Sheraton in 1974 and became the Biltmore Towers Hotel. In 1981, the Kuhlmann Design Group redeveloped the property into elderly housing, known as Biltmore Towers. On February 3, 1982, the Dayton Biltmore was added to the National Register of Historic Places, qualifying because of its historically significant architecture.

Apartments and commercial space
The eighteen-story Biltmore has undergone a number of renovations over the years, the most recent of which was conducted in 1981, when the Kuhlmann Design Group redeveloped the property into elderly housing.  Today, the building houses 230 apartments ranging in size from 500 sqft 1-bedrooms to 713 sqft 2-bedrooms. Known as Biltmore Towers - Senior Living, it caters to residents 55 years and older. The building is situated alongside the Great Miami River, steps away from Riverscape Metropark, Victoria Theater, Cooper Park, and Courthouse Square.  The property is currently owned and managed by Apartment Investment and Management Company (AIMCO).

In addition to the apartments, the property also contains seven retail spaces, totaling . 
The current business tenants are China Royal Restaurant, a Jimmy John's restaurant, Liberty Tax Services, and St. Mary's, resident services on the 4th floor.  Previous tenants include Wendy's Old Fashioned Hamburgers, Rock Star Sub Sandwiches, Ernie Loeb's restaurant, and a physician's office.

Gallery

See also
 National Register of Historic Places listings in Dayton, Ohio

References

External links

Hotel buildings on the National Register of Historic Places in Ohio
Bowman-Biltmore Hotels
Beaux-Arts architecture in Ohio
National Register of Historic Places in Montgomery County, Ohio
Hotel buildings completed in 1929
Hotels established in 1929
Sheraton hotels
1929 establishments in Ohio